

Belgium
 Congo Free State 
 Camille Janssen, Administrator-General of the Congo Free State (1886–1891), Governor-General after March 26, 1887

France
 Obock and Tadjoura – 
 Léonce Lagarde, Commandant of Obock and Tadjoura (1884–1887)
 Léonce Lagarde, Governor of Obock and Tadjoura (1887–1888)
 Riviéres du Sud – Jean-Marie Bayol, Lieutenant-Governor of Riviéres du Sud (1882–1891)

Portugal
 Angola – Gilherme Auguste de Brito Capelo, Governor-General of Angola (1886–1892)

United Kingdom
 British Virgin Islands – Edward John Cameron, Administrator of the British Virgin Islands (1887–1894)
 Malta Colony – Lintorn Simmons, Governor of Malta (1884–1888)
 New South Wales – Charles Wynn-Carington, Lord Lincolnshire, Governor of New South Wales (1885–1890)
 Queensland – Sir Anthony Musgrave, Governor of Queensland (1883–1888)
 Tasmania – Robert Hamilton, Governor of Tasmania (1887–1892)
 South Australia – Sir William Robinson, Governor of SouthAustralia (1883–1889)
 Victoria – Henry, Lord Loch, Governor of Victoria (1884–1889)
 Western Australia – Sir Frederick Broome, Governor of Western Australia (1883–1890)

Colonial governors
Colonial governors
1887